USS Birmingham (SSN-695), a , was the third ship of the United States Navy to be named for Birmingham, Alabama. The contract to build her was awarded to Newport News Shipbuilding and Dry Dock Company in Newport News, Virginia on 24 January 1972 and her keel was laid down on 26 April 1975.  She was launched on 29 October 1977 sponsored by Mrs. Maryon Pittman Allen, wife of Senator James Allen, and commissioned on 16 December 1978.

Birmingham was decommissioned and stricken from the Naval Vessel Register on 22 December 1997. Ex-Birmingham was scheduled to enter the Nuclear Powered Ship and Submarine Recycling Program in Bremerton, Washington on 1 October 2012. In September 2015, Birminghams sail was placed on static display at Defense Supply Center, Columbus.

References

External links

 Unofficial web site of USS Birmingham SSN 695

Los Angeles-class submarines
Cold War submarines of the United States
Nuclear submarines of the United States Navy
1977 ships
Ships built in Newport News, Virginia